Milan Đokić may refer to:
 Milan Đokić (politician)
 Milan Đokić (footballer)